In the United States, the National Estuary Program (NEP) provides grants to states where governors have identified nationally significant estuaries that are threatened by pollution, land development, or overuse. Governors have identified a total of 28 estuaries, and the Environmental Protection Agency (EPA) awards grants to these states to develop comprehensive management plans to restore and protect the estuaries. Congress created the NEP in the 1987 amendments to the Clean Water Act.

Program organization 

The National Estuary Program is made up of 28 smaller organizations set up regionally by estuary. Each of the estuary organizations is managed by local community leaders and staff. Participating organizations may include universities, local non-profit organizations, and state and local government agencies. It is the job of the NEP to help communities better protect, restore and maintain their estuaries. Unlike traditional environmental governance approaches, the NEP targets a broader range of issues and participates more effectively in local communities.

Before establishment of the national program, some small local grassroots organizations pursued environmental improvement efforts in various regions of the country, with limited effect. The programs now focus not just on improving water quality in an estuary, but on maintaining the integrity of the system as a whole. If all parts of the estuary are not addressed it will be unable to balance the changes and may ecologically collapse, doing more harm than good. That includes chemical, physical, and biological properties, as well as its economic, recreational, and aesthetic public values. This allows communities that live in watersheds to have local as well as national protection.

EPA provides annual funding and technical assistance to the local estuary programs.

Common challenges addressed by local programs 
Each of the participating coastal areas has suffered varying degrees of impacts with regard to water quality and habitat decline. Many of the local estuary programs have initiated projects in one or more of the following problem categories.
 Alteration of environmental flows, which may include hydromodification
 Climate change
 Declines in fish and wildlife populations
 Habitat loss
 Invasive species
 Pollutants:
 Nutrients (nitrogen and phosphorus compounds)
 Pathogens
 Urban runoff
 Toxics.

Local programs 
 Albemarle - Pamlico National Estuary Program, Virginia/North Carolina
 Barataria-Terrebonne National Estuary Program, Louisiana
 Barnegat Bay Partnership, New Jersey
 Buzzards Bay National Estuary Program, Massachusetts
 Casco Bay Estuary Partnership, Maine
 Charlotte Harbor National Estuary Program, South Carolina
 Coastal Bend Bays and Estuaries Program, Texas
 Delaware Center for the Inland Bays, Delaware
 Galveston Bay Estuary Program, Texas
 Indian River Lagoon National Estuary Program, Florida
 Long Island Sound Study, New York
 Lower Columbia Estuary Partnership, Oregon/Washington
 Maryland Coastal Bays Program, Maryland
 Massachusetts Bays National Estuary Program, Massachusetts
 Mobile Bay National Estuary Program, Alabama
 Morro Bay National Estuary Program, California
 Narragansett Bay Estuary Program, Rhode Island
 New York-New Jersey Harbor Estuary Program, New York
 Partnership for the Delaware Estuary, Delaware
 Peconic Estuary Program, New York
 Piscataqua Region Estuaries Partnership, Maine/New Hampshire
 Puget Sound Partnership, Washington
 San Francisco Estuary Partnership, California
 San Juan Bay Estuary Partnership, Puerto Rico
 Santa Monica Bay Restoration Foundation (now Bay Foundation), California
 Sarasota Bay Estuary Program, Florida
 Tampa Bay Estuary Program, Florida
 Tillamook Estuaries Partnership, Oregon

Transparency concerns 
In 2016 a Los Angeles County Superior Court judge found that the Santa Monica Bay Restoration Commission violated the California Public Records Act by failing to disclose records about a wetlands restoration project.

See also 
National Estuarine Research Reserve

References

External links 
 National Estuary Program - US EPA

Estuaries of the United States
United States Environmental Protection Agency
Water resource management in the United States